Holy Family Catholic High School is a coeducational Roman Catholic secondary school located in Carlton in the Selby District of North Yorkshire, England.

The school has capacity for 450 pupils. Currently 444 pupils attend the school.

The school was rated as "Requires Improvement" by Ofsted in September 2019. Only 8% of students achieve the English Baccalaureate, compared with 43% of students in the Local Authority Area as a whole. However, performance in core GCSEs is in line with the local average, with 46% of Holy Family pupils achieving grade 5 or above in their English and maths GCSEs compared with 47% in the Local Authority.

Previously a voluntary aided school administered by North Yorkshire County Council, in March 2021 Holy Family Catholic High School converted to academy status. The school is now sponsored by the Bishop Konstant Catholic Academy Trust.

The school offers GCSEs and Cambridge Nationals as programmes of study for pupils.

References

External links
 

Secondary schools in North Yorkshire
Catholic secondary schools in the Diocese of Leeds
Academies in North Yorkshire
Educational institutions established in 1967
1967 establishments in England